Jan Niklas Skoog (born 15 June 1974) is a Swedish former professional footballer who played as a striker. He was the Allsvenskan top scorer in 1995 with Västra Frölunda IF and in 2003 with Malmö FF. A full international between 2002 and 2004, he appeared nine times for the Sweden national team, scoring four goals.

Club career 
Skoog was the Allsvenskan top scorer for Västra Frölunda in 1995 and for Malmö FF in 2003.

In 2004, Skoog was part of the Malmö FF side that won Allsvenskan. In the final game, he had a penalty kick saved that team mate Jon Inge Høiland scored the rebound of to seal a 1-0 win against Elfsborg that ultimately secured the title.

He initially ended his career for Malmö FF in March 2009. In January 2010, he announced that he would restart his playing career in Swedish lower league club BK Näset.

International career 
Having scored 10 goals in 14 games for the Sweden U21 team, Skoog made his full international debut for Sweden on 20 November 2002 in a friendly game against the Czech Republic. On 16 February 2003, he scored his first goal for Sweden in a friendly against Qatar.

Skoog made his first and only competitive appearance for Sweden on 6 September 2003 in a UEFA Euro 2004 qualifier against San Marino, replacing Mattias Jonson as a forward in the 73rd minute. He made his last international appearance for Sweden in a friendly against Portugal on 29 April 2004, replacing Marcus Allbäck at half time in a 2–2 draw.

Career statistics

International 

Scores and results list Sweden's goal tally first, score column indicates score after each Skoog goal.

Honours

Malmö FF
 Allsvenskan: 2004

Individual
 Allsvenskan top scorer: 1995, 2003

References

External links
 

1974 births
Living people
Footballers from Gothenburg
Association football forwards
Swedish footballers
Sweden international footballers
Sweden under-21 international footballers
MSV Duisburg players
1. FC Nürnberg players
Örebro SK players
Malmö FF players
Allsvenskan players
Bundesliga players
Swedish expatriate footballers
Expatriate footballers in Germany